Gardet is a French surname. Notable people with the surname include:

 Georges Gardet (1863–1939), French sculptor and animalier
 Louis Gardet (1904–1986), French Roman Catholic priest and historian

See also 
 Gärdet, part of Stockholm, Sweden
 Gärdet metro station in Stockholm

French-language surnames